Jack Leitch (born 17 July 1995) is a Scottish footballer who plays for Stirling Albion. A midfielder, he started his career with Motherwell and was a product of the Motherwell Academy. In 2016, he moved to Airdrieonians and had one season with the Diamonds.  Leitch then played for Peterhead for three seasons before signing for Stirling Albion in 2020.

Career

Motherwell
On 30 November 2013, Leitch made his debut for Motherwell as a substitute in a surprise 1–0 defeat against Lanarkshire derby opponents Albion Rovers in the Scottish Cup. His first start came on 1 March 2014, in a 4–1 win against Heart of Midlothian. On 4 June 2014, Leitch signed a new two-year contract at Motherwell.

Leitch missed a large part of the 2014–15 season after suffering a cruciate ligament injury in an under-20 match against St Johnstone in October 2014. He was released by the club at the end of the 2015–16 season after his contract expired.

Airdrieonians
On 2 September 2016, Leitch signed for Airdrieonians, joining permanently having already played for the club as a trialist.

Peterhead
Leitch signed a one-year contract with Scottish League Two club Peterhead on 4 August 2017. On 4 May 2019, he scored twice as Peterhead won 2–0 away to Queen's Park at Hampden, a result which clinched the League Two title.

In June 2019, Leitch signed a new contract with Peterhead for the 2019–20 season.

Career statistics

Honours
Peterhead
Scottish League Two: 2018–19

Personal life
Leitch is the eldest son of former Motherwell captain Scott Leitch.

References

External links
 Jack Leitch profile at Motherwell FC official website
 

1995 births
Living people
Footballers from Motherwell
Scottish footballers
Association football midfielders
Motherwell F.C. players
Airdrieonians F.C. players
Peterhead F.C. players
Scottish Professional Football League players
Stirling Albion F.C. players